General Thurman may refer to:

James D. Thurman (born 1953), U.S. Army general
Maxwell R. Thurman (1931–1995), U.S. Army general
Roy Thurman (1924–2004), U.S. Army lieutenant general
William E. Thurman (born 1931), U.S. Air Force lieutenant general